In Mandaeism, Yushamin and also known as the 'Second Life', is the primal uthra (angel or guardian) and a subservient emanation who was created by the Mandaean God 'The Great Life' (Hayyi Rabbi or 'The First Life'), hence beginning the creation of the material world. Yushamin is the father of Abatur. Jorunn J. Buckley identifies Yushamin as "both a Lightworld utra beyond reproach and the prototype of a priest who has made mistakes in ritual."

Name and epithets
The name may be derived from Iao haš-šammayim (in Hebrew: Yahweh "of the heavens"). In the Diwan Masbuta d-Hibil Ziwa, he is called the "pure Yušamin", "Yušamin the Peacock", and "Yušamin, son of Dmut-Hiia", where Dmut-Hiia/Dmuth-Hayyi ("Likeness/Image of Life") refers to Yushamin's mother.

Role

Rebellion
Yushamin and his sons set in motion the events leading to creating the material world (tibil), due to deciding to participate in creation without consulting the First Life; this is accounted in book 3 of the Right Ginza. The first ten chapters of the Mandaean Book of John give further accounts related to the progress of the rebellion of Yushamin and his sons against the King of Light (i.e. Hayyi Rabbi), and their eventual reconciliation against the wishes of Manda d-Hayyi.

In the first two chapters, Kushta asks questions which are answered by Ptahil and his son Yukashar. Yushamin is mentioned in the first chapter as having set the eternal great conflict in motion, and in more detail in the second as having revealed the secret of the Great, and been cast down due to starting a fight with the Light, or the Mighty's house, lacking concern and humility, in contrast to Yukabar having brought calm.

In the third chapter, twenty-one of the sons of the captive Yushamin, excluding the elder brother Sam but including his favourite son Yukabar and led by Etinṣib Ziwa, start a battle against Nbaṭ, the King of Air, and are slaughtered upon the arrival of the forces of the King of Light. An irate Yushamin breaks his bonds and proceeds from the Nether Gate to the Realm of Air, destroying all in his wake and defeating the uthri, until Hayyi binds him again by the Nether Gate in 904 chains of zenyā.

In the fourth chapter, Nṣab Ziwa admonishes his father Yushamin over his rebellion. In the fifth chapter, Hayyi sends Manda d-Hayyi to admonish Yushamin over his plots to overthrow him, who responds with threats of defeating Manda d-Hayyi had Yushamin come to Manda d-Hayyi as opposed to the latter having been sent as a messenger; the exceedingly brief sixth chapter contrasts this with a throned, non-captive Yushamin revering Manda d-Hayyi as the King of the Uthri.

The seventh chapter recapitulates the rebellion of Yushamin and his sons. The eighth chapter gives an account of Nṣab bringing a petition for forgiveness for Yushamin to the King of Light, who accepts it against the wishes of Manda d-Hayyi, and cautions the latter for hating Yushamin for refusing him a wife. The ninth is a dialogue between Yushamin, Manda d-Hayyi and Nṣab; the tenth is a monologue by Yushamin.

Hibil's descent
Yushamin is dispatched to interrogate Hibil Ziwa's identity and permit him re-entry to the World of Light when he returns from his descent to the World of Darkness.

Other
According to E. S. Drower, in documents giving ritual instruction, Yushamin serves as the spiritual prototype of a priest who makes errors in conducting a ritual.

Parallels
The story of Yushamin in Mandaeism is one of the parallels to the Christian Gnostic story of Sophia, since both seek to create without the consent of the supreme deity, thereby starting the process of creating the material world. However, the origin of the demiurgic (Ptahil) is attributed to Abatur, the Third Life, and the fallen Sophia pending redemption parallels Ruha.

See also
List of angels in theology
Sophia (Gnosticism)
Titanomachy

Footnotes

References

Individual angels
Uthras
War in mythology